Morley Kamen, known professionally as Morley, is an American singer-songwriter. Born in New York City, a Jamaica, Queens native, Morley has released six studio albums, under the auspices of Sony, Universal and independently.

Biography
Morley began her performing career as a dancer and choreographer/poet, and taught yoga, meditation and dance in community centers and shelters around the NY tristate area. 
By the late-1990s she began writing songs, and in 1998 she released her first album, Sun Machine, on Sony/Work. Allmusic writer Tom Demalon called it an "impressive [debut] that infuses her melodic brand of adult pop with folk, world, and jazz." 
Martin Johnson of Newsday wrote that the album's songs "recalled the socially conscious soul of the early '70s." 
Spin's Tracey Pepper suggested that the album shared qualities of those by Annie Lennox and Tracey Thorn 
while Time compared Morley to Sade Joni Mitchell and Portishead.

Morley released her second album, Days Like These, in 2005, followed by Seen in 2008. Thom Jurek of Allmusic praised Seen as "an album so original and poetically beautiful, it deserves its own category." 
On album track "Women of Hope", Jurek remarked: "Morley prays for and celebrates those women who suffer from war – without once sounding preachy or holier-than-thou or precious."

In addition to releasing records, Morley is engaged in conflict resolution work with teens from conflict zones, here in the US and abroad. She has performed for several TED events and for such world leaders as the Dalai Lama, Nelson Mandela, and Ban Ki-moon.

Morley's fourth album, Undivided, was released in April 2012. Recorded with such guests as Joan Wasser, Raul Midón, and David Amram, the album was inspired by trips Morley had taken to Paris and parts of North Africa. The music video for the single "Wild Bird", directed by Damani Baker, was filmed in the Sahara.

In August 2012 Morley published her fifth album, "Yoga Release (Rhythms & Improv)", an exploration of rhythm and spiritual warrior survival.

In 2019 Morley Released her sixth album, "Thousand Miles" featuring Brian Blade, Richard Bona, Jon Cowherd

Discography
Sun Machine (1998)
Days Like These (2005)
Seen (2008)
Undivided (2012)
Yoga Release (Rhythms & Improv) (2012)
Thousand Miles (2019)

References

External links

American contraltos
American women singer-songwriters
American pop rock singers
Record producers from New York (state)
American rock songwriters
Women rock singers
Living people
People from Queens, New York
Singers from New York City
Year of birth missing (living people)
21st-century American women singers
American women record producers
21st-century American singers
Singer-songwriters from New York (state)